Aluvarus praeimperialis is an extinct bony fish, known from two headless fossil specimens found in the Elam Formation, a Lower Oligocene stratum from the Rupelian epoch, of what is now Iran.  A. praeimperialis was originally thought to be a luvar, described as "Luvarus praeimperialis," as it was thought to be a predecessor to the modern luvar.  A later reexamination of the specimens showed that they were too incomplete to demonstrate such a conclusion, and were renamed "Aluvarus," meaning "Not" or "Different than Luvar."

See also

 Prehistoric fish
 List of prehistoric bony fish

References

Bannikov, A, Tyler, J: "Phylogenetic Revision of the Fish Families Luvaridae and †Kushlukiidae (Acanthuroidei), with a New Genus and Two New Species of Eocene Luvarids" 

Fossils of Iran
Ray-finned fish enigmatic taxa
Oligocene fish of Asia